The 1990–91 Northern Counties East Football League season was the 9th in the history of Northern Counties East Football League, a football competition in England. Division Two was disbanded at the end of the season. Most of the Division Two clubs were promoted to Division One.

Premier Division

The Premier Division featured 12 clubs which competed in the previous season, along with four new clubs.
Clubs promoted from Division One:
Maltby Miners Welfare
Ossett Town
Plus:
Spennymoor United, transferred from the Northern League
Winterton Rangers, promoted from Division Two

Map

League table

Division One

Changes made before start of season:
Clubs relegated from the Premier Division:
Grimethorpe Miners Welfare
Hallam
Hatfield Main
Sheffield
Clubs promoted from Division Two:
Glasshoughton Welfare
Selby Town
Yorkshire Main

BSC Parkgate changed name to RES Parkgate.
Collingham, Woolley Miners Welfare and Frecheville Community Association all left the league.

Map

League table

Division Two

Division One featured ten clubs which competed in the previous season, along with three new clubs, relegated from Division One:
Immingham Town
Kiveton Park
Rowntree Mackintosh

Map

League table

References

1990–91
8